Ranskill railway station served the village of Ranskill, Nottinghamshire, England from 1849 to 1964 on the East Coast Main Line.

History 
The station opened on 4 September 1849 by the Great Northern Railway. During the Second World War, there was a Royal Ordnance Factory located on the up side with its own factory station. The station was closed to passengers on 6 October 1958 and was closed completely on 7 December 1964.

References

External links 

Disused railway stations in Nottinghamshire
Former Great Northern Railway stations
Railway stations in Great Britain opened in 1849
Railway stations in Great Britain closed in 1958
1849 establishments in England
1964 disestablishments in England